The 2019–20 Washington State Cougars women's basketball team represent Washington State University during the 2019–20 NCAA Division I women's basketball season. The Cougars, led by second year head coach Kamie Ethridge, play their home games at the Beasley Coliseum and are members of the Pac-12 Conference.

Previous season
The 2018-2019 edition of the WSU Courgars women's basketball team finished with a record of 9 wins and 21 losses. The Cougars finished Pac-12 Conference play with a record of 4 wins and 14 losses. This resulted in a 10th place finish in the regular season conference standings. In the 2019 Pac-12 Conference women's basketball tournament the cougars were defeated by the Cal Bears in the tournament's first round.

Roster

Schedule

|-
!colspan=9 style=| Exhibition

|-
!colspan=9 style=| Non-conference regular season

|-

|-

|-
!colspan=9 style=| Pac-12 regular season

|-
!colspan=9 style=| Pac-12 Women's tournament

Rankings
2019–20 NCAA Division I women's basketball rankings

See also
 2019–20 Washington State Cougars men's basketball team

References

Washington State Cougars women's basketball seasons
Washington State
2019 in sports in Washington (state)
2020 in sports in Washington (state)